Sonny Stitt Plays Arrangements from the Pen of Quincy Jones is an album by saxophonist Sonny Stitt recorded in 1955 and originally released on the Roost label.

Reception
The Allmusic site awarded the album 4½ stars.

Track listing 
All compositions by Sonny Stitt except as indicated
 "My Funny Valentine" (Lorenz Hart, Richard Rodgers) - 3:26    
 "Sonny's Bunny" - 3:58    
 "Come Rain or Come Shine" (Harold Arlen, Johnny Mercer) - 4:19 
 "Love Walked In" (George Gershwin, Ira Gershwin) - 4:03 
 "If You Could See Me Now" (Tadd Dameron, Carl Sigman) - 4:29    
 "Quince" - 6:59 
 "Stardust" (Hoagy Carmichael, Mitchell Parish) - 3:08    
 "Lover" (Hart, Rodgers) - 3:24 
Recorded in New York City on September 30, 1955 (tracks 1, 2, 4 & 8) and October 9, 1955 (tracks 3 & 5–7)

Personnel 
Sonny Stitt - alto saxophone
Thad Jones (tracks 3, 5 & 6), Joe Newman (tracks 3, 5 & 6), Jimmy Nottingham (tracks 1, 2, 4, 8), Ernie Royal (tracks 1, 2, 4 & 8) - trumpet
Jimmy Cleveland (tracks 3, 5 & 6), J. J. Johnson (tracks 1, 2, 4 & 8) - trombone
Anthony Ortega - flute, alto saxophone (tracks 1-6 & 8)
Seldon Powell - tenor saxophone (tracks 1-6 & 8)
Cecil Payne - baritone saxophone (tracks 1-6 & 8)
Hank Jones - piano
Freddie Green - rhythm guitar
Oscar Pettiford - bass
Jo Jones - drums
Quincy Jones - arranger, conductor

References 

1956 albums
Roost Records albums
Sonny Stitt albums
Albums produced by Teddy Reig
Albums arranged by Quincy Jones